The 1890 Arkansas gubernatorial election was held on September 1, 1890.

Incumbent Democratic Governor James Philip Eagle defeated Union Labor and Republican fusion nominee Napoleon B. Fizer with 55.51% of the vote.

General election

Candidates
James Philip Eagle, Democratic, incumbent Governor
Napoleon B. Fizer, Union Labor, Methodist minister

The Republican Party endorsed Fizer.

Results

References

1890
Arkansas
Gubernatorial